Nowa Kuźnia may refer to the following places in Poland:
Nowa Kuźnia, Bolesławiec County in Lower Silesian Voivodeship (south-west Poland)
Nowa Kuźnia, Polkowice County in Lower Silesian Voivodeship (south-west Poland)
Nowa Kuźnia, Opole Voivodeship (south-west Poland)